The Squawkin' Hawk is a 1942 Merrie Melodies cartoon directed by Chuck Jones. The short was released on August 8, 1942, and is the first to star the young Henery Hawk. It was animated by Phil Monroe and was written by Michael Maltese, the latter being his first collaboration with Jones.

Plot
Junior wants a chicken for dinner, saying that he is a chicken hawk. His mother insists he eat a worm, or he will get no supper. Junior refuses, much to the worm's relief. Junior's mother puts him to bed and tells him to "go right to sleep". Henery sneaks out his house at bedtime, then goes to the chicken coop and soon finds a rooster and his hen, Hazel, who has a panic reaction at the sound of the words "chicken hawk". The rooster chases him until his mother spots him and sends him home. He is again told to eat a worm and again refuses and says he wants a "chicken", at which point the worm gives him a big kiss on the beak.

Reception
The Film Daily called the short "Good", saying, "The adventures of a baby chicken hawk who goes out prowling for chicken after refusing to sup on worms are treated with loads of fun in this Technicolor short."

References

External links
 

1942 films
1942 animated films
Merrie Melodies short films
Short films directed by Chuck Jones
Animated films about animals
Animated films about birds
Films scored by Carl Stalling
1940s Warner Bros. animated short films
Henery Hawk films
Films about worms